The Jonsson Workwear Open is a professional golf tournament held at The Club at Steyn City, in Midrand, South Africa. It is currently played on the European Tour and Sunshine Tour as a co-sanctioned event, having previously been played on the Challenge Tour.

The tournament was inaugurated in 2022 as a co-sanctioned event between the Sunshine Tour and Challenge Tour. J. C. Ritchie won the event, shooting 26-under-par, beating Christopher Mivis by six shots.

The 2023 event was scheduled as a co-sanctioned European Tour and Sunshine Tour event, played at The Club at Steyn City, the same venue in which the 2022 Steyn City Championship was played at.

Winners

Notes

References

External links
Coverage on European Tour official site

European Tour events
Sunshine Tour events
Former Challenge Tour events
Golf tournaments in South Africa